is a Japanese visual novel publishing brand owned and used by Inter Heart.

Games released
April 25, 1997 - 
June 27, 2003 - 
June 25, 2004 - 
August 26, 2005 - 
December 15, 2006 - 
September 21, 2007 - 
April 25, 2008 - 
July 31, 2009 - 
July 30, 2010 - 
March 31, 2011 -

External links
  Candy Soft Official Website
 

Video game publishing brands